Fan Zhongjie (born June 1966) is a former Chinese politician who spent his entire career in southeast China's Guangdong province. As of October 2022 he was under investigation by China's top anti-corruption agency. Previously he served as party secretary of the State owned Assets Supervision and Administration Commission of Guangdong Provincial People's Government.

He is a delegate to the 13th National People's Congress.

Early life and education
Fan was born in Xichong County, Sichuan, in June 1966. In 1983, he entered Sichuan Normal University, where he majored in the Department of Education. From 1987 to 1990 he did his postgraduate work at South China Normal University. He was also a PhD student at Wuhan University between September 2005 and June 2008.

After University in 1990, he taught at Huiyang Normal School. After this office was terminated in December 1994, he became university administrator of Huizhou University, serving until July 2001.

Political career
Fan joined the Chinese Communist Party (CCP) in July 1994. In July 2001, he became deputy director of Huizhou Municipal Education Bureau, rising to director in August 2005. He was chosen as assistant mayor of Huizhou in August 2008. He was appointed secretary-general of the CCP Huizhou Municipal Committee in October 2011 and was admitted to member of the Standing Committee of the CCP Huizhou Municipal Committee, the city's top authority. He was appointed vice mayor in January 2017. 

He was deputy party secretary of Zhaoqing in July 2011, in addition to serving as mayor since August. In October 2019, he rose to become party secretary, the top political position in the city, and concurrently served as chairman of Zhaoqing Municipal People's Congress.

In June 2021, he took office as party secretary of the State owned Assets Supervision and Administration Commission of Guangdong Provincial People's Government.

Investigation
On 30 October 2022, Fan was put under investigation for alleged "serious violations of discipline and laws" by the Central Commission for Discipline Inspection (CCDI), the party's internal disciplinary body, and the National Supervisory Commission, the highest anti-corruption agency of China.

References

1966 births
Living people
People from Nanchong
Sichuan Normal University alumni
South China Normal University alumni
Wuhan University alumni
People's Republic of China politicians from Sichuan
Chinese Communist Party politicians from Sichuan
Delegates to the 13th National People's Congress
Mayors of Zhaoqing